Bynum Peak is a rock peak  southeast of Mount Finley, overlooking the north side of McGregor Glacier in the Queen Maud Mountains. It was named by the Advisory Committee on Antarctic Names for Gaither D. Bynum, a United States Antarctic Research Program satellite geodesist at McMurdo Station, winter 1965.

References 

Mountains of the Ross Dependency
Dufek Coast